Freudenberg is a municipality in the Amberg-Sulzbach district, in Bavaria, Germany. It is situated approximately 10 km north-east of Amberg.

References

Amberg-Sulzbach